Eupyra sarama is a moth of the subfamily Arctiinae. It was described by Paul Dognin in 1891. It is found in Venezuela.

References

 Natural History Museum Lepidoptera generic names catalog

Arctiinae
Moths described in 1891